Peake-Jones Rock is a low, bean-shaped rock lying just off the coast and  northeast of Ring Rock in Holme Bay, Mac. Robertson Land. The rock was mapped by Norwegian cartographers from air photos taken by the Lars Christensen Expedition, 1936–37. It was named by Antarctic Names Committee of Australia (ANCA) for K. Peake-Jones, weather observer at Mawson Station in 1959.

Rock formations of Mac. Robertson Land